Rude Awakening is the fifth studio album by American metal band Prong. It is an enhanced CD but was also released as a special limited edition on 12" red vinyl. The album was reissued in 2008 as a digipak version, featuring four remixes of the "Rude Awakening" single and a new booklet.

Rude Awakening entered the Billboard charts at No. 107 and sold 10,000 units in the United States in its first week. It is the last Prong album to feature Ted Parsons and Paul Raven, as well as the band's last album on Epic Records.

Reception 

Reviewing the title track, Billboard wrote that the single's "assaulting, deviant style" shows why Prong is popular.  Jenni Glenn of CMJ New Music Monthly wrote that the album is heavier and angrier than Cleansing, blending thrash metal and industrial music.

Track listing 
All tracks written by Prong except "Controller" (Prong and Scott Albert) and "Slicing" (Prong and Joe Bishara Kebbe).
"Controller" – 3:39
"Caprice" – 2:47
"Rude Awakening" – 4:18
"Unfortunately" – 3:08
"Face Value" – 4:09
"Avenue of the Finest" – 3:37
"Slicing" – 3:29
"Without Hope" – 3:13
"Mansruin" – 3:29
"Innocence Gone" – 3:11
"Dark Signs" – 3:22
"Close the Door" – 4:05
"Proud Division" – 5:46

Personnel
Tommy Victor - vocals, guitar
Paul Raven - bass guitar
Ted Parsons - drums
Additional personnel
Charlie Clouser - drum programming, keyboards

Chart positions

References

External links
 

Prong (band) albums
1996 albums
Albums produced by Terry Date
Albums produced by Tommy Victor
Epic Records albums